Agriculture in Malaysia makes up twelve percent of the nation's GDP. Sixteen percent of the population of Malaysia is employed through some sort of agriculture. Large-scale plantations were established by the British. These plantations opened opportunity for new crops such as rubber (1876), palm oil (1917), and cocoa (1950). A number of crops are grown for domestic purpose such as bananas, coconuts, durian, pineapples, rice and rambutan.

Climate
The climate of Malaysia produces the proper conditions for the production of exotic produce. It is located on a peninsula in Southeast Asia. This area is very rarely affected by hurricanes or drought. Malaysia maintains a humidity level around ninety percent because of its location close to the equator. The weather stays hot and humid all year round.

Ministry of Agriculture and Agro-Based Industry, Malaysia (MOA)
This ministry is also known as the Kementerian Pertanian & Industry Asas Tani Malaysia. The MOA had its name changed to the current title on 27 March 2004. The ministry serves as an agency for private agricultural businesses to get advised by experts that specialise in agriculture, fishing, and livestock. The ministry plans the policies, strategies, and different development programs. It monitors, surveys, directs, and puts into action the projects given by the Integrated Agricultural Development Project (IADP). The ministry has services such as collecting, analysing and restoring information and agricultural data through science and provide the report to farmers. It provides references and agricultural management systems for plantation owners to access all collected agriculture information.

Rice production and consumption 
Rice is a crucial part of everyday Malaysian diet. In 1998, Malaysia produced 1.94 million metric tons of rice. Even with this high production, Malaysia still only produces eighty percent of what it needs to support itself and must import the rest. The average Malaysian citizen consumes 82.3 kilograms of rice per year. The increasing population calls for more research and technological advancement to increase rice production for consumption within the nation.

Statistics
Nearly twenty four percent of Malaysia's land area is composed of land dedicated to agriculture alone. There are around 43,000 different agricultural machines and tractors. Malaysia contains 7,605,000 hectares of arable and permanent cropland. Malaysia produces 535,000 metric tons of bananas per year. Only about five percent of Malaysia's cropland is actually irrigated. This chart displays a predicted relationship between consumption of rice, the amount planted, and the increase in population from 2008 up until 2030.

Rubber production

Typically, Malaysia is responsible for one third of the world's rubber export. However, production has decreased because most states are switching to a more profitable product, palm oil. Malaysia is also an exporter of timber, pepper, and tobacco. Since 2001, Malaysia's rubber production has been increasing. In 2004, production value reached eight billion dollars, in 2007 it topped ten billion dollars, and in 2008, production value is sitting at 11.24 billion dollars. In 2009 however, production plummeted by nearly six percent. Malaysia has earned a good reputation around the world for its high quality and well priced rubber products. Rubber manufacturers in Malaysia supply several rubber products such as medical gloves, components for automobiles, belts, and hoses to several countries such as the United States, Japan, China, and many countries in Europe.

Tourism
Agriculture-related tourism in Malaysia are:
 Agricultural Museum
 Pineapple Museum

References